Ralston Phoenix is an Antigua and Barbudan football player. He has played for Antigua and Barbuda national team.

National team statistics

References

Living people
Antigua and Barbuda footballers
Antigua and Barbuda international footballers
Antigua Barracuda F.C. players
USL Championship players
Association football forwards
1981 births